Whinney Banks is an area in west Middlesbrough, North Yorkshire, England. The area is on the Old River Tees's southern banks, the river's main flow was redirected with the Mandale Cut, the A19 is between the old river and the area. It is within the TS5 postcode area and a part of the Ayresome ward, along with parts of Ayresome.

History
Whinney Banks was originally of around 550 houses, built in the 1930s and 1940s, forming part of a wider expanse of social housing in west Middlesbrough.

Gallery

References

External links 
 National Statistics

Areas within Middlesbrough